The Kombai or Polygar dog is a breed of working dog native to Tamil Nadu in Southern India. Traditionally kept for guarding and protection, they have a reputation for making excellent guard dogs. they were also occasionally used for hunting big games.

Description 
They have a short, smooth coat that is usually light brown to dark red in colour, and a black muzzle. They have dark eyes, the mid-length ears with bent tips, and a fine muzzle. The breed has a broad, slightly haired tail that is carried over their back resembling a sickle.

The Kombai is described as highly intelligent and extremely loyal to, and affectionate with, people they are familiar with, being particularly sweet-natured and tolerant of children with whom they allow particularly rough play, but when aroused by strangers or unfamiliar dogs they can be ferocious, making them excellent guard dogs.

History 

The breed originated in the Theni district and is named after the town of Kombai. It subsequently spread throughout Southern India. The Kombai was traditionally kept by zamindars and others for coursing a variety of game. When hunting it is particularly robust and athletic, easily clearing hedges and other obstacles. They are also called polygar dogs.

The Kannada Vokkaliga zamindars of Kombai presented Tipu Sultan and Hyder Ali with these dogs for their army. The ferocious dogs were trained to rip the hamstrings of enemy horses. Tipu sent the town an idol of Ranganathaswamy in gratitude. It is said that the Kombai polygars valued the dog so highly that in olden days they were ready to exchange a horse for one.

There are conflicting reports about the status of the breed; some reports from the 1960s stated the dog was popular and numbers were increasing, whilst others from the same period described them as practically extinct. A Tamil Nadu state-run dog-breeding facility did take up the cause of breeding the Kombai, along with a number of other local breeds.  However, it was reported they suspended their Kombai breeding program when owners who had purchased dogs returned them, finding their character ill-suited to keeping as pets.

See also
 Dogs portal
 List of dog breeds
 List of dog breeds from India
 Kombai Dog History and Insight

References

Sighthounds
Dog breeds originating in India